Abernant Colliery was a coal mine in the River Amman valley at Pwllfawatkin,  north of Pontardawe and  north of Swansea, West Wales.

Development
Abernant was developed by the National Coal Board as one of the West Wales "super pits" alongside Cynheidre Colliery in the Gwendraeth valley, an investment intend to keep economic coal mining a viable industry in the area.

The £10million development began in 1954, with the sinking of two of the deepest shafts in the coalfield to allow access to the Peacock anthracite seam.

Operations

Production started two years later, with coal extracted along the Amman Valley branch of the former Llanelly Railway and Dock Company, and on to the mainline at Pantyffynnon.

In 1962, the colliery developed access to the Red Vein seam, resulting in the abandonment of the lower Peacock seams from 1963.

The colliery was one of the first NCB pits to deploy retreat mining, whereby roadways were driven to the limit of the coal reserves, and then the coal faces then worked towards the pit bottom.

Closure
Abernant closed in 1988.

Present
In September 2011, Waste Recycling Group Ltd submitted plans for the development of an anaerobic digestion facility on the old colliery site. Proposed to run on food waste collected from 350,000 homes in Bridgend, Carmarthenshire, Neath Port Talbot, Pembrokeshire and Swansea, the 2.3 MW facility would be capable of generating enough electricity to meet the demands of approximately 5,000 homes, and producing fertiliser.

References

External links
Abernant Colliery @ WelshCoalMines.co.uk

Collieries in South Wales
Buildings and structures in Neath Port Talbot
Underground mines in Wales